Ouratea schusteri is a species of plant in the family Ochnaceae. It is found in Kenya and Tanzania.

References

External links
 

schusteri
Endemic flora of Kenya
Endemic flora of Tanzania
Vulnerable flora of Africa
Taxonomy articles created by Polbot